This is the discography of Soft Cell, a British synthpop duo consisting of Marc Almond and Dave Ball who rose to prominence in the early 1980s. The duo broke up in 1984 after releasing four albums, but reunited in the early 2000s for a series of live dates and released an album of new material in 2002. The group reunited again in 2018 for a final farewell concert, accompanied by a host of musical and video releases, including a career-spanning box set and a single.

Albums

Studio albums

Remix albums

Live albums

Compilation albums
Charting compilations

Complete list
1982 – The Twelve Inch Singles (Some Bizzare) (6x12" vinyl boxset with booklet)
1986 – The Singles (Some Bizzare)
1991 – Memorabilia – The Singles (Mercury) (Soft Cell with Marc Almond)
1994 – Down in the Subway (Spectrum)
1996 – Say Hello to Soft Cell (Spectrum)
1998 – Master Series (Mercury)
2001 – The Twelve Inch Singles (Polygram) (3CD re-release of the 1982 boxset)
2002 – The Very Best of Soft Cell (Universal)
2005 – The Bedsit Tapes (Some Bizzare) (Recorded in 1978–1980)
2006 – Demo Non Stop (Some Bizzare) (Recorded in 1978–1980)
2006 – 20th Century Masters – The Millennium Collection: The Best of Soft Cell (Universal)
2008 – Heat: The Remixes (Mercury) (2CD collection of new remixes)
2017 - Hits & Pieces The Best of Marc Almond and Soft Cell (UMC)
2018 - Keychains & Snowstorms – The Soft Cell Story (10 Disc Box Set) (UMC)
2018 - Keychains & Snowstorms – The Singles (UMC)

Extended plays

Singles

Promotional singles
 1981 – "Sex Dwarf/Entertain Me/Seedy Films" (US Dance #65)
 1982 – "What/Insecure...Me?"
 1984 – Songs from The Last Night in Sodom

Video albums

Music videos

Rarities and miscellaneous

Notes

References

 
Discographies of British artists
Pop music group discographies
New wave discographies